Bill Day (born September 12, 1959) is an American documentary filmmaker and YouTuber. Day worked for both the National Geographic Channel and Discovery Channel. For CNN, he produced a documentary film about the Osa Peninsula.

Career
Day directed the documentary Saviors of the Forest which was shown at the Sundance Film Festival. He also directed Rubber Jungle, a behind the scenes look at the life of Brazilian labor leader Chico Mendes and the movie about his life.

In 2002, Day co-produced the musical documentary Under The Covers, followed by Alternative Rock and Roll Years in 2003 for Discovery Channel. Day served as a field producer for Hopkins 24/7, a television documentary series. With Carlo Gennarelli, he co-produced Ordinary Joe, a documentary film about Joe Sciacca, a Vietnam veteran from New York City. Day made a film about XXXchurch.com called Missionary Positions. He also produced and directed The Pussycat Preacher, a film about Heather Veitch and her organization, JC's Girls. 

He holds the YouTube channel 'billschannel', which posts videos of wildlife trips around the world and a series named 'Real or Fake?' This series shows him and his research group 'The Chewy Piranhas' uncover photographs and videos on the internet and using various methods to show whether they are portraying real-life events, fake hoaxes or unknown mysteries.

Personal life
Day dated Marcheline Bertrand for a time and helped her raise Angelina Jolie and James Haven, whom she had with Jon Voight.

References

External links 
 
 

American documentary film directors
American documentary film producers
American film producers
UCLA Film School alumni
National Geographic (American TV channel)
Discovery Channel people
20th-century births
Living people
Year of birth missing (living people)
YouTube travel vloggers